Harry Clarke was an Irish stained-glass artist and book illustrator. He produced more than 130 stained glass windows, he and his brother Walter having taken over his father's studio after his death in 1921. His glass is distinguished by the finesse of its drawing and his use of rich colours, and an innovative integration of the window leading as part of the overall design, originally inspired by an early visit to see the stained glass of the Cathedral of Chartres. He was especially fond of deep blues. Clarke's use of heavy lines in his black-and-white book illustrations echoes his glass techniques.

Clarke's work includes both religious and secular stained glass windows. Highlights of the former include the windows of the Honan Chapel in University College Cork; of the latter, a window illustrating John Keats' The Eve of St. Agnes (now in the Hugh Lane Municipal Gallery in Dublin) and the Geneva Window, (now in the Wolfsonian Museum, Miami, Florida, USA). Perhaps his most seen works were the windows he made for Bewley's Café on Dublin's Grafton Street.

List of leaded glass windows (by Harry Clarke)

References

Harry Clarke